Urbanus is a Belgian comedian, actor, and singer.

Urbanus may also refer to:

Urbanus (album), by Stefon Harris
Urbanus (butterfly), a genus of skippers
Urbanus (comic strip), a comic strip by Urbanus

People
Pope Urban
Urbanus (usurper), 3rd-century Roman usurper
Urbanus Rhegius, Protestant Reformer
Urbanus Joseph Kioko, Kenyan bishop

See also
Urban (disambiguation)